Sylvain Charlebois is a Canadian researcher and professor in food distribution and policy at Dalhousie University in Halifax, Nova Scotia, Canada. He is a former dean of the university's Faculty of Management. Charlebois, who calls himself "The Food Professor", is director of the Agri-Food Analytics Lab at Dalhousie University.

Career 
Charlebois was a professor at the University of Guelph from 2010 to 2016. In 2016, he was named dean of the Faculty of Management at Dalhousie University. In 2018, Charlebois became the director of Agri-food Analytics Lab at Dalhousie, after resigning as dean following an investigation into complaints involving harassment and bullying.

Charlebois writes a blog for Canadian Grocer magazine called "The Food Professor," and is a co-host of the podcast titled "The Food Professor."

Studies and reports 
Charlebois  publishes Canada's Food Price Report since 2010. He has also co-authored reports related to the Canadian Wheat Board’s Daily Price Contract program, Canada's Food Guide, edible cannabis legislation,  global food traceability systems, and public perception towards GMOs.

In January 2023 Charlebois penned a commentary piece deriding those who steal from supermarkets, opining that an increase in theft forced grocers to raise prices. The piece was met with online backlash, as people accused Charlebois of not caring about those unable to afford food, and commented that Canada's supermarket chains have been reporting record profits. Twitter users drew attention to Charlebois's annual salary from Dalhousie University, as well as his acceptance of a $60,000 grant from the Weston Foundation, which is controlled by the owners of Loblaw Companies, Canada's largest grocery retailer. In response, Charlebois stated that the Weston money was used to pay graduate students, and denied that Canadian grocers are overcharging.

References 

Canadian economists
Academic staff of the Dalhousie University
Living people
Royal Military College Saint-Jean alumni
Université de Montréal alumni
Université de Sherbrooke alumni
Academic staff of the University of Guelph
Year of birth missing (living people)